Refuge Gian Federico Benevolo is a refuge in the Alps in Aosta Valley, Italy.
The setting at 2285m is beautiful, and within a six hours walk from Rifugio Citta di Chivasso to the East and Rifugio Bezzi to the West. 

Mountain huts in the Alps
Mountain huts in Italy